Ashfaqulla Khan (22 October 1900 – 19 December 1927) was an Indian independence activist in the Indian independence movement and co-founder of the Hindustan Republican Association.

Early life
Khan was born in the Shahjahanpur district of the United Provinces to Shafiq Ullah Khan and Mazharunissa, Muslim Pathans of the Khyber tribe who belonged to the landlord class. He was the youngest among his five siblings.

In 1918, while Khan was in the seventh standard, police raided his school and arrested the student Rajaram Bhartiya in relation to the Mainpuri Conspiracy, in which activists organised looting in Mainpuri to fund the publication of anti-colonial literature. The arrest spurred Khan's engagement in revolutionary activities in the United Provinces.

Khan met Ram Prasad Bismil, a revolutionary who was closely involved in the Mainpuri Conspiracy, through a friend. He soon became closely tied to Bismil and joined him in activities related to non-cooperation, the Swaraj Party, and the Hindustan Republican Association. Bismil and Khan were also both poets, with Khan writing Urdu poetry under the pseudonym Hasrat.

Like others in the Hindustan Republican Association, Khan was strongly inspired by Lenin and the Bolshevik Revolution in Russia. He expressed beliefs in the liberation of the poor and the rejection of capitalist interests. He also spoke against religious communalism, identifying it as a British tool to control the Indian population and prevent Indian independence.

Involvement in the Kakori train robbery

The revolutionaries of the Hindustan Republican Association organised a meeting in Shahjahanpur on 8 August 1925 to determine how to raise funds for arms and ammunition. They decided to rob a train carrying government cash through Kakori. The HRA had previously executed similar train robberies, inspired by the Russian Bolshevik technique of using robbery to fund revolutionary operations. He was originally against the Kakori train robbery, but eventually agreed to participate when others in the HRA expressed approval of the plan.

On 9 August 1925, Khan and other revolutionaries, namely Ram Prasad Bismil, Rajendra Lahiri, Thakur Roshan Singh, Sachindra Bakshi, Chandrashekhar Azad, Keshab Chakravarty, Banwari Lal, Murari Lal Gupta, Mukundi Lal, and Manmathnath Gupta, attacked and robbed a government train in Kakori near Lucknow. After the robbery, the British government launched an extensive investigative campaign to catch the perpetrators. On the morning of 26 October 1925, Bismil was caught by the police. Khan fled to Nepal to evade capture. From Nepal, he travelled to Kanpur and then Daltonganj, where he worked as a clerk at an engineering firm under a pseudonym.

Capture and trial 
Eventually, Khan decided to travel to Delhi to continue his revolutionary activities. While in Delhi, he met with a Pathan friend he had known in Shahjahanpur, who secretly reported his whereabouts to the police. On the morning of 7 December 1926, Khan was captured and arrested by the Delhi Police. He was detained in the District Jail at Faizabad and a case was filed against him.

The trial of the Kakori train robbers was held for over a year in Lucknow and received significant interest from the public. The HRA had released an official statement in 1925 claiming that they did not consider themselves terrorists and instead saw their revolutionary activities as a way to fight back against the violence of the colonial government. While in prison, Khan wrote a letter that expressed a similar sentiment, confirming that he did not aim to spread violence through the HRA but only hoped to ensure India's independence.

Death and aftermath
The case for the Kakori dacoity was concluded by imposing the death sentence on Bismil, Khan, Lahiri, and Roshan. The others were given life sentences. Khan was sentenced to death by hanging and executed on 19 December 1927 at the Faizabad Jail. He is considered a martyr for the cause of India's independence.

After the hangings of Khan, Bismil, Lahiri, and Roshan, the HRA changed their name to the Hindustan Socialist Republican Army and began officially espousing socialist and Marxist ideologies.

In popular culture
The actions of Khan and his compatriots have been depicted in the Hindi film Rang De Basanti (2006), where his character is depicted by Kunal Kapoor. Chetanya Adib portrayed Khan in the Star Bharat television series Chandrashekhar. Mujahid-E-Azadi – Ashfaqullah Khan, an Indian television series that aired on DD Urdu in 2014, starred Gaurav Nanda in the titular role.

See also
 Ram Prasad Bismil
 Mohammad Abdullah
 Sher Ali Afridi
 Shivaram Rajguru
 Hindustan Socialist Republican Association

Citations

General bibliography 
 

1900 births
1927 deaths
Revolutionary movement for Indian independence
Executed revolutionaries
Indian revolutionaries
People executed by British India by hanging
People from Shahjahanpur
20th-century Indian Muslims
Indian people of Pashtun descent
Executed Indian people
20th-century executions by British India
Hindustan Socialist Republican Association
Indian nationalists
Indian independence armed struggle activists